Campanula  is one of several genera  in the family Campanulaceae with the common name bellflower. It takes its name from their bell-shaped flowers  –  is Latin for "little bell".

The genus Campanula contains about 473 species, including:

Campanula abietina
Campanula acarnanica
Campanula achverdovii
Campanula acutiloba
Campanula adsurgens
Campanula affinis
Campanula afra
Campanula aghrica
Campanula aizoides
Campanula aizoon
Campanula akuschensis
Campanula alaskana
Campanula alata
Campanula albanica
Campanula albertii
Campanula albicans
Campanula albovii
Campanula aldanensis
Campanula alliariifolia
Campanula alpestris
Campanula alpina
Campanula alsinoides
Campanula americana
Campanula amorgina
Campanula anchusiflora
Campanula andrewsii
Campanula angustiflora
Campanula anomala
Campanula aparinoides – marsh bellflower
Campanula ardonensis
Campanula argaea
Campanula argyrotricha
Campanula aristata
Campanula arvatica
Campanula aucheri
Campanula autraniana
Campanula balfourii
Campanula barbata – bearded bellflower
Campanula baumgartenii
Campanula bayerniana
Campanula beauverdiana
Campanula bellidifolia
Campanula besenginica
Campanula betulifolia
Campanula biebersteiniana
Campanula bononiensis
Campanula bravensis
Campanula caespitosa
Campanula calaminthifolia
Campanula californica
Campanula carpatha
Campanula carpatica – Carpathian harebell
Campanula cashmeriana
Campanula celsii
Campanula cenisia
Campanula cervicaria
Campanula cespitosa
Campanula chamissonis
Campanula choruhensis
Campanula ciliata
Campanula cochleariifolia – fairies' thimble
Campanula collina
Campanula colorata
Campanula conferta
Campanula crenulata
Campanula crispa
Campanula cymbalaria
Campanula davisii
Campanula debarensis – Debar's bellflower
Campanula dichotoma
Campanula divaricata
Campanula dolomitica
Campanula drabifolia
Campanula dzaaku
Campanula edulis
Campanula elatines
Campanula elatinoides
Campanula elegantissima
Campanula ephesia
Campanula erinus
Campanula excisa
Campanula exigua – chaparral bellflower
Campanula fenestrellata
Campanula filicaulis
Campanula formanekiana
Campanula fragilis
Campanula fruticulosa
Campanula gansuensis
Campanula garganica – Adriatic bellflower
Campanula gelida
Campanula glomerata – clustered bellflower
Campanula griffinii
Campanula hakkiarica
Campanula hagielia
Campanula hawkinsiana
Campanula hedgei
Campanula hemschinica
Campanula hercegovina
Campanula heterophylla
Campanula hieracioides
Campanula hypopolia
Campanula imeretina
Campanula incanescens
Campanula incurva
Campanula involucrata
Campanula isaurica
Campanula isophylla – Italian bellflower
Campanula jacobaea
Campanula jaubertiana
Campanula kachethica
Campanula kantschavelii
Campanula kemulariae
Campanula khasiana
Campanula kirpicznikovii
Campanula kolakovskyi
Campanula kolenatiana
Campanula komarovii
Campanula kryophila
Campanula laciniata
Campanula lactiflora – milky bellflower
Campanula lanata
Campanula lasiocarpa – Alaskan harebell, mountain harebell
Campanula latifolia – giant bellflower
Campanula latiloba
Campanula ledebouriana
Campanula leucosiphon
Campanula lingulata
Campanula linifolia
Campanula loefflingii
Campanula longistyla
Campanula lourica
Campanula lusitanica
Campanula lyrata
Campanula macrorhiza
Campanula macrostyla
Campanula makaschvilii
Campanula mairei
Campanula malicitiana
Campanula massalskyi
Campanula medium – Canterbury bells
Campanula meteora
Campanula michauxioides
Campanula mirabilis
Campanula modesta
Campanula moesiaca
Campanula mollis
Campanula monodiana
Campanula morettiana
Campanula myrtifolia
Campanula napuligera
Campanula oblongifolia
Campanula ochroleuca
Campanula oligosperma
Campanula olympica
Campanula orbelica
Campanula oreadum
Campanula orphanidea
Campanula pallida
Campanula paradoxa
Campanula parryi
Campanula patula – spreading bellflower
Campanula pelviformis
Campanula pendula
Campanula peregrina
Campanula persicifolia – peach-leaved bellflower
Campanula petraea
Campanula petrophila
Campanula phrygia
Campanula phyctidocalyx
Campanula pilosa
Campanula piperi
Campanula portenschlagiana – wall bellflower
Campanula poscharskyana – Serbian bellflower
Campanula postii – Serbian bellflower
Campanula prenanthoides
Campanula primulifolia
Campanula propinqua
Campanula ptarmicaifolia
Campanula pulla
Campanula punctata – spotted bellflower
Campanula pyramidalis – chimney bellflower
Campanula quercetorum – chimney bellflower
Campanula raddeana
Campanula radchenis
Campanula radicosa
Campanula radula
Campanula raineri
Campanula ramosissima
Campanula rapunculoides – creeping bellflower
Campanula rapunculus – rampion bellflower
Campanula recta – rampion bellflower
Campanula reiseri
Campanula reuteriana
Campanula rhomboidalis
Campanula rigidipila
Campanula robinsiae – Brooksville bellflower, Robins' bellflower
Campanula rotundifolia – harebell
Campanula rupestris
Campanula rupicola
Campanula ruprechtii
Campanula samarkandensis
Campanula sarmatica
Campanula sartorii
Campanula saxatilis
Campanula saxifraga
Campanula scabrella
Campanula scheuchzeri
Campanula scouleri
Campanula seraglio
Campanula serrata
Campanula sharsmithiae
Campanula shetleri
Campanula sibirica
Campanula sosnowskyi
Campanula spatulata
Campanula speciosa
Campanula spicata
Campanula spruneriana
Campanula stefanoffii
Campanula stevenii
Campanula stricta
Campanula strigillosa
Campanula strigosa
Campanula suanetica
Campanula takesimana – Korean bellflower
Campanula teucrioides
Campanula thessela
Campanula thyrsoides_ Strauß bellflower
Campanula tomentosa
Campanula tommasiniana
Campanula trachelium – nettle-leaved bellflower
Campanula transsilvanica – Transsylvanian bellflower
Campanula trautvetteri
Campanula tridentata
Campanula troegerae
Campanula turczaninovii
Campanula uniflora
Campanula velebitica
Campanula versicolor
Campanula violae
Campanula wilkinsiana
Campanula zoysii

References

External links

Germplasm Resources Information Network

Campanula